For all participating teams for the men's rugby sevens competition at the 2020 Summer Olympics, each squad could have up to 12 players, however in July 2021, the International Olympic Committee allowed reserves to also compete due to the COVID-19 pandemic. This meant each team could have up to 12 players plus one alternate.

Group A

Argentina

Argentina's 12-man squad plus one alternate was named on 6 July 2021.

Head coach: Santiago Gómez Cora

Australia

Australia's 12-man squad plus one alternate was named on 6 July 2021. Nathan Lawson replaced Henry Paterson due to injury on 18 July 2021.

Head coach: Tim Walsh

New Zealand

New Zealand's 12-man squad plus one alternate was named on 6 July 2021. Amanaki Nicole replaced Sam Dickson due to injury on 23 July 2021.

Head coach: Clark Laidlaw

South Korea

South Korea's 12-man squad plus one alternate was named on 6 July 2021.

Head coach: Seo Chun-oh

Group B

Canada

Canada's 12-man squad plus one alternate was named on 25 June 2021.

Head coach: Henry Paul

Fiji

Fiji's 12-man squad plus one alternate was named on 6 July 2021.

Head coach: Gareth Baber

Great Britain

Great Britain's 12-man squad plus one alternate was named on 6 July 2021.

Head coach: Simon Amor

Japan

Japan's 12-man squad plus one alternate was named on 6 July 2021.

Head coach: Kensuke Iwabuchi

Group C

Ireland

Ireland's 12-man squad plus one alternate was named on 6 July 2021.

Head coach: Anthony Eddy

Kenya

Kenya's 12-man squad plus one alternate was named on 6 July 2021.

Head coach: Innocent Simiyu

South Africa

South Africa's 12-man squad plus one alternate was named on 6 July 2021.

Head coach: Neil Powell

United States

United States' 12-man squad plus one alternate was named on 6 July 2021. Brett Thompson replaced Ben Pinkelman due to injury on 8 July 2021.

Head coach: Mike Friday

References

Rugby sevens men
Squads
2020